Dundee United are a Scottish professional association football club based in the city of Dundee. The club compete in the Scottish Championship, the second tier of the SPFL structure. The club was formed in 1909.

Key
The records include the results of matches played in the SPFL, Scottish Cup, Scottish League Cup and Scottish Challenge Cup.
The records exclude European matches. All records are from domestic competitions only.
The records do not include matches played in regional tournaments, such as the Forfarshire Cup.
Wartime matches are regarded as unofficial and are excluded.
The season given as the "last" designates the most recent season to have included a match between Dundee United and that side.
P = matches played; W = matches won; D = matches drawn; L = matches lost; F = goals for; A = goals conceded; Winning% = percentage of total matches won; Unbeaten% = percentage of total matches not lost
 Denotes clubs in the same division as Dundee United in the 2014–15 season.
 Denotes current SPFL clubs not in the same division as United.
 Denotes current non league clubs.
 Denotes clubs which are now defunct.

All–time statistics

a  All matches are either League or Cup matches played either home or away, matches played at neutral venues are also included in the total section.
b  Results in all competitions until July 2012 are sourced to Arab Archive. Results in all competitions post July 2012 are sourced to BBC Sport.
c  Type in a team to get all head-to-head results against that team.

European matches
For Dundee United matches in Europe, see Dundee United F.C. in European football

Notes

References

External links
Dundee United F.C. head-to-head records
Soccerbase - The Football Database
Scottish Football Historical Archive

Record by club
Dundee United
Opponents